BookCrossing (also BC, BCing or BXing) is defined as "the practice of leaving a book in a public place to be picked up and read by others, who then do likewise." The term is derived from bookcrossing.com, a free online book club which was founded to encourage the practice, aiming to "make the whole world a library."

The "crossing" or exchanging of books may take any of a number of forms, including wild-releasing books in public, direct swaps with other members of the websites, or "book rings" in which books travel in a set order to participants who want to read a certain book. The community aspect of BookCrossing.com has grown and expanded in ways that were not expected at the outset, in the form of blog or forum discussions, mailing lists and annual conventions throughout the world.

History
Leaving reading materials in public places when no longer needed has long been a silent means of communication and sociability amongst bibliophiles.  Ron Hornbaker conceived the idea for what is now known as BookCrossing in March 2001 and enlisted business partners and co-founders Bruce and Heather Pedersen to launch BookCrossing.com on April 21, 2001.

After two years the website had over 113,000 members and by 2004 it was prominent enough to be referenced in an episode of the Australian soap opera Neighbours. The same year it appeared as a new word in the Concise Oxford Dictionary, although as of 2017 only Collins of the major online dictionaries retained it as a word.

Membership surpassed 1 million by March 2012 and the registered book count exceeded 8.5 million. By November 2019, there were over 1.9 million members and over 13 million books travelling through 132 countries, of which over 25 thousand books newly "released in the wild" in the previous month across over 60 countries, with over 80% of the books being released in the 8 most active countries (Germany, United States, Spain, Italy, Australia, United Kingdom, the Netherlands and Brasil), while 30 countries had seen a book release in the previous 3 days.

In July 2007 Singapore became the first country to give the practice official status, designating 2,000 locations in the country as 'hotspots', similar to Official BookCrossing Zones, in an initiative launched with the National Library of Singapore. The world's first official International BookCrossing Day took place on 21 April 2014.

Bookcrossing is also actively developing in the countries of Eastern Europe, in particular Ukraine, from 2021 in small and large cities.

Awards
In May 2005 BookCrossing.com won two People's Voice awards in the Webby Awards for best community website and best social/networking website. BookCrossing was also featured in a BBC Radio project broadcast as 84 Book Crossing Road, which involved releasing 84 copies of Helene Hanff's book 84 Charing Cross Road around the world.  The programme was nominated for a Sony Radio Academy Award in 2006.

About

Anyone who wishes to officially participate in "releasing" books, whether leaving it in a public place or passing it on to a friend, may register on the BookCrossing.com website, although there is the option to remain anonymous when "catching" or recording the find of a book. BookCrossing.com users can 'go hunting', where a member will go to the website to view a list of books that have recently been "released", then go to the location it was left to "catch" it. Books may also be left at "Official BookCrossing Zones" (OBCZs), which are located in certain coffee shops, cafes, restaurants and other public places. The purpose of these locations is to get current members in the area to leave books to share with the public. This also advertises BookCrossing and creates more members.

Conventions and unconventions
There is a BookCrossing anniversary convention every April, where BookCrossers go to enjoy organized literary-related events and release books together. The location of the convention changes each year: Here is a list of past and forthcoming conventions:

Many unofficial conventions or "unconventions" take place at other locations and times throughout the year, making it easier for BookCrossers who cannot travel internationally for the convention to gather and share their love of books.

Controversy and criticism
In 2003, BookCrossing was criticized by the astrologer and novelist Jessica Adams, who claimed that books were being "devalued" by the website as BookCrossing could lead to lower sales of books and, therefore, the reduction in royalties being paid to authors. Most BookCrossers dispute this argument, however. They claim that the website introduces readers to authors and genres that they have not read before, that the website encourages more people to take up or reclaim reading as a hobby, and that some members, having read a book that they have enjoyed, will buy extra copies to distribute through BookCrossing.

In March 2005, Caroline Martin, managing director of the publisher Harper Press, said in a speech that "book publishing as a whole has its very own potential Napster crisis in the growing practice of bookcrossing".  BookCrossers rebutted the link to Napster, saying that while music filesharing involves duplicating audio files countless times, BookCrossing doesn't involve duplicating books (and also does not involve violating copyright, as books can be sold or given away freely without permission of the publisher being needed). When BookCrossing was first launched, the founder of BookCrossing, Ron Hornbaker, originally wondered if people would make this comparison.

Prominent BookCrossers
 Richard Bach
 R J Ellory
 Jim Hawkins

See also 
Book swapping: contains a list of other book-swapping websites
Book sales club
Give-away shop
Library
Gift economy
Postcrossing
Public bookcase
Reuse
Sharing

References

External links

 

Internet properties established in 2001
Book websites
Internet object tracking
Book swapping
American social networking websites